Strange Faces is a 1938 American drama film directed by Errol Taggart and written by Charles Grayson. The film stars Frank Jenks, Dorothea Kent, Andy Devine, Leon Ames, Mary Treen and Frank M. Thomas. The film was released on November 13, 1938, by Universal Pictures.

Plot

Cast        
Frank Jenks as Nick Denby
Dorothea Kent as Maggie Moore
Andy Devine as Hector Hobbs
Leon Ames as Joe Gurney
Mary Treen as Lorry May
Frank M. Thomas as Ward
Spencer Charters as Mason City Sheriff
Joe King as Police Lt. Hennigan
Renie Riano as Mrs. Keller
Frank Jaquet as Henry Evans
Frances Robinson as Girl in café
Eddie "Rochester" Anderson as William
Mark Daniels as Young man in café

References

External links
 

1938 films
American drama films
1938 drama films
Universal Pictures films
Films directed by Errol Taggart
American black-and-white films
1930s English-language films
1930s American films